Ramji, also known as Ram G, is an Indian dance choreographer and actor, known for his works predominantly in Tamil cinema, and television. He is well known for his performances in Kasalavu Nesam, Ramany vs Ramany and Marmadesam.

Career
The actor-choreographer often appeared in Tamil film dance numbers like "Vellarika" from Kadhal Kottai, "Easwara" from Kannedhirey Thondrinal and "Nee Paathuthu Ponnalum" from Paarvai Ondre Podhume being prime examples of his roles. In 2001, Ramji toured Japan as a part of the Tamil musical "Thilana", playing the lead role in a venture developed by Bharathan and scripted by Anita Raj and Kalyan.

As offers to feature in films began to recede, Ramji became a television compere for shows including "Dance Machi Dance", before accepting to play a role in the low-budget film, Madhavi (2009). He appeared in a series of HIV awareness adverts shown on South Indian television in 2010 as a character called "Dhillu Durai". The ad was directed by duo JD-Jerry and featured three teasers promoting AIDs awareness centres called Nambikkai Mayyam (ICTC). Later in the year, he played a supporting role in Rama Narayanan's Kutti Pisasu alongside Sangeetha and Ramya Krishnan.

Filmography

Films

Short films

Dubbing artist

Television

References

External links

Ramji Japan Dance

Living people
Tamil male actors
Tamil theatre
Tamil male television actors
Television personalities from Tamil Nadu
Male actors from Tamil Nadu
Male actors in Tamil cinema
Indian choreographers
Tamil Reality dancing competition contestants
1977 births